Surigao Strait (Filipino: Kipot ng Surigaw) is a strait in the southern Philippines, between the Bohol Sea and Leyte Gulf of the Philippine Sea.

Geography
It is located between the regions of Visayas and Mindanao. It lies between northern Mindanao Island and Panaon Island, and between the Dinagat Islands and Leyte island.

The northern entrance of the Surigao Strait is marked by a navigation light on Suluan Island.

The Hibuson island lies at the north end of the Surigao Strait.

Transport
It is regularly crossed by numerous ferries that transport goods and people between Visayas and Mindanao. The ferries stop at Liloan, Southern Leyte and Surigao City in Surigao del Norte.

Etymology
According to legend, the strait was named after Solibao, a Negrito chieftain, who lived at the outlet of the Surigao River. Migrating Visayan fishermen gradually formed a settlement there, and when Spanish explorers visited the place, they probably misheard the name as Surigao instead of Solibao. A different theory explains that Surigao may be derived from the Spanish word surgir, meaning "swift water" or "current".

History
In March 1521 during the first circumnavigation of the Earth, Ferdinand Magellan and his crew were the first Europeans to sail through the strait.

The Battle of Surigao Strait took place here on October 25, 1944. The American battleships of the U.S. 7th Fleet Support Force commanded by Rear Admiral Jesse B. Oldendorf were able to "cross the T" against Vice Admiral Shoji Nishimura's Southern Force; nearly all of which, including the battleships Yamashiro and Fusō, were sunk. All but one of these American battleships had been in Pearl Harbor during the Japanese sneak attack and either damaged or sunk and subsequently refloated and repaired.

References

External links
 

Straits of the Philippines
Bohol Sea
Philippine Sea
Landforms of Surigao del Norte
Landforms of Southern Leyte
Landforms of Dinagat Islands
Maritime Southeast Asia